Shinas is a catamaran ferry in service on the Shinas–Khasab route in Oman, reportedly the fastest diesel ferry in the world.

 The route connects Musandam Governorate, an exclave of Oman at the tip of the Musandam peninsula, to Oman proper, without crossing through United Arab Emirates like the overland route.

References 

2008 ships
Ferries
Musandam Governorate
2008 establishments in Oman
Al Batinah North Governorate